The Oklahoma Space Industry Development Authority (OSIDA) is a development authority created by the state of Oklahoma to operate a spaceport near Burns Flat, Oklahoma.

The Authority's primary asset is the former Clinton-Sherman Industrial Airpark, a former military airport featuring a redundant 13,503-foot-long paved runway.  The airpark has been renamed the Oklahoma Air & Space Port.  Although the Oklahoma Spaceport received a Commercial Space Transportation license from the U.S. Federal Aviation Administration in June 2006, the Spaceport has not yet hosted any sub-orbital spaceflights or launches of spacecraft into earth orbit.  However, the facility is still listed as an FAA currently-licensed launch site as of June 2020.

The first executive director of the Authority was Bill Khourie.  Craig Smith became the new executive director in 2020 upon Khourie's retirement after 18 years of service.

See also
 California Space Authority
 New Mexico Spaceport Authority
 Space Florida
 Virginia Commercial Space Flight Authority

References

Aerospace business development agencies
State agencies of Oklahoma